Villaseca may refer to:

Marco Villaseca (born 1975), Chilean footballer
Villaseca de Arciel, a municipality in Castile and León, Spain
Villaseca de Henares, a municipality in Castile-La Mancha, Spain
Villaseca de la Sagra, a municipality in Castile-La Mancha, Spain
Villaseca de Uceda, a municipality in Castile-La Mancha, Spain 
[ [ Villaseca Pedro de Nicolas]] (born in 1986) A chilean

See also
 Vila-seca, a municipality of the comarca of Tarragonès, Catalonia, Spain